The Chief of Staff of Puerto Rico is the highest-ranking officer in the executive branch of the government of Puerto Rico after the governor and the secretary of state. The Chief of Staff leads the Secretariat of Governance and is charged with managing and overseeing almost all executive agencies while assisting and advising the governor.

Duties and responsibilities
The duties of the chief of staff vary greatly from one administration to another, and in fact, there is no legal requirement that the governor even fill or create the position.  Nevertheless, one of the first acts undertaken by a new governor once he is sworn in, is to issue an executive order proclaiming a new chief of staff. This order also establishes the chief of staff's duties and responsibilities as the governor sees fit. This proclamation is done by virtue of the executive powers vested upon the governor by Article IV of the Constitution and Law No. 104 of 1956, which include the faculty to appoint officers and to delegate functions.

The duties and responsibilities are both managerial and advisory and typically include the following:
 Manage and supervise the executive departments of the government of Puerto Rico
 Manage the flow of information between the Governor and the executive departments
 Advise the Governor on various issues

Agencies overseen

Both the Constitution of Puerto Rico and Puerto Rican law usually ascribe all executive offices to either the Governor or the Office of the Governor. The Governor then issues an executive order proclaiming the delegation of the management and oversight of such executive offices onto the chief of staff. This proclamation is done in virtue of the executive powers vested upon the Governor by Law No. 104 of 1956 which include the faculty to delegate functions.

The agencies overseen by the Chief of Staff include all the executive departments of the government of Puerto Rico and almost all executive offices created either through an executive order or by law. The Office of Management and Budget and the Planning Board are the only executives offices not ascribed to the Secretariat—both report directly to the Governor.

In view of the fact that the Department of State is led by the Secretary of State, who is of a higher constitutional hierarchy than the Chief of Staff as well as Acting Governor on numerous occasions, as a matter of courtesy Chiefs of Staffs usually do not exercise oversight regarding that Department as they exert over others.

The agencies overseen by the Chief of Staff include the following:

 Commission on Cooperative Development
 Commission on Safety and Public Protection
 Department of Agriculture
 Department of Consumer Affairs
 Department of Corrections and Rehabilitation
 Department of Economic Development and Commerce
 Department of Education
 Department of Family Affairs
 Department of Health
 Department of Housing
 Department of Justice
 Department of Labor and Human Resources
 Department of Natural and Environmental Resources
 Department of Public Safety

 Department of Sports and Recreation
 Department of Transportation and Public Works
 Department of Treasury
 Economic Development Bank
 Federal Affairs Administration
 Financing of Housing Authority
 Financing of Industrial, Touristic, Educative, Medical, and Environmental Control Facilities Authority (AFICA)
 Financing of Puerto Rico Infrastructure Authority
 Government Development Bank
 Municipal Financing Agency
 Public Financing Corporation
 Public-Private Partnerships Authority
 Urgent Interest Fund Corporation (COFINA)

Chiefs of Staff

References

Cabinet-level officers of the Cabinet of Puerto Rico
 
Secretariat of Governance of Puerto Rico